IDFL Laboratory and Institute, (originally known as the International Down and Feather Testing Laboratory) is the largest down and feather testing laboratory in the world with over 8,000 clients in 80 countries. IDFL provides testing services for filled-textiles like: down and feather material and products, textiles, synthetic fills, and natural fills. IDFL also offers audit and inspection services. IDFL is headquartered in Salt Lake City, Utah and has offices in Frauenfeld, Switzerland, Taipei, Taiwan and Hangzhou, China.

IDFL has over 150 employees, the majority of which work as testing analysts. IDFL's laboratories are certified by various quality regulation institutions such as the IDFB, EDFA, and DPSC. IDFL also conducts tests and research according to quality standards established by AATCC, ADFC, ASTM, CFDIA, DAC, EDFA, IABFLO, IDFB, and TDFA.

History
Wilford Lieber Sr. and his wife, Mary Jean, founded IDFL in Salt Lake City, Utah in 1978. Lieber had previously worked for the state of Utah in product regulation and at the request of companies in the down and feather industry, Lieber formed IDFL, a laboratory that tested down and feather quality.

Wilf Lieber Jr. is the current CEO  of IDFL Laboratory and Institute and serves as associate member of many organizations including the IDFB, ADFC, EDFA and CFDIA

Since its founding, IDFL has continually expanded the services it provides. In the 1980s, IDFL expanded to offer consulting services and fabric testing. In the 1990s, IDFL began factory inspection services as well as research services. In the 2000s, IDFL began synthetic filling testing, finished product inspection services, non-down filling testing, and audit services. In 2002, IDFL opened an office in Frauenfeld, Switzerland. In 2003, IDFL opened an office in Hangzhou, China. .

Down and Feather Testing
IDFL assists companies in the down and feather industry acquire sterilization permits and meet customer quality expectations by inspecting factories and testing down and feather material. IDFL grades material quality by testing down and feather composition, content analysis, and species type as well as numerous other quality factors. Material is also graded for cleanliness by examining the fat and oil percentages, pH levels, odor, turbidity, and other purity factors. All down and feather material is double tested.

IDFL tests materials according to the following standards:

Audit Services
IDFL consults with clients by conducting traceability audits of supply chains primarily for CSR topics like live plucking.  IDFL consults or performs audits under different licenses such as: 
– IDFL internal standard, this standard began in 2008 and has gone through different revisions since.  It has options of scope which allow tracing a particular leg, location or the whole of a supply chain. 
– Traumpass standard, this is a German-based standard that translates as 'dream standard' and is developed by the German Down and Feather Association. 
– Downpass standard, is a standard that is based all of European Union Directives.  It contains a quality element verifying the quality of the material and in addition has the actual audit process tracing material from a product to the source of the raw materials.  This standard is strongest in Europe, and countries with higher European influence but is gaining traction in other North American markets. 
– RDS (Responsible Down Standard)   This standard was developed with many discussions in the OIA (Outdoor Industry Association), but was then completed by The North Face and then strategically gifted to the Textile Exchange  The RDS standard has claimed to save 
– TDS (Traceable Down Standard), This standard was developed by Patagonia to address needs in their supply chain and was also gifted to NSF (National Safety Foundation).  It was also seen as a way for Patagonia to not be outdone by competitor TNF 

Audit services typically consist of tracing material from a finished good back to the original sources through different means.  Either through invoices or through an audit system that tracks the chain of custody and will include visiting supply chains and factories to verify down and feather material is not originating from live plucking, Foie Gras production and also can inspect other elements such as sterilization procedures.

A new element that is being considered to support the traceability audits is isotope technology which IDFL also provides.

Inspection Services
IDFL provides inspection services in behalf of clients in order to confirm products being imported have been manufactured according to specifications and labeling standards. IDFL also assesses factory quality control methods, inspects finished products, and consults companies in quality control procedures.

Consulting and Training
IDFL also provides many different types of trainings, seminars and other consulting work

References

External links

https://www.linkedin.com/company/idfl/
https://www.facebook.com/IDFLLaboratory/

Commercial laboratories
Laboratories in the United States
1978 establishments in Utah
Featherwork